For the 1999 Vuelta a España, the field consisted of 189 riders; 115 finished the race.

By rider

By nationality

References

1999 Vuelta a España
1999